Karl Muru (1 January 1927 Pikkjärve, Kaarepere Parish (now Jõgeva Parish) – 30 May 2017) was an Estonian literary scholar and literary critic.

In 1958 he graduated from the University of Tartu. Since 1958 he taught at Tartu University, and became a professor there in 1978.

His major work was the Estonian poetry anthology "Sõnarine".

In 2002, he was awarded with the Order of the White Star, IV class.

Works
 1975: article collection "Vaated kolmest aknast"
 1987: article collection "Kodus ja külas" 
 1989–1995: poetry collection "Sõnarine" I–IV
 2001: article collection "Luuleseletamine"
 2014: article collection "Rännul luuleilmas"

References

1927 births
2017 deaths
People from Jõgeva Parish 
Communist Party of the Soviet Union members
Estonian literary scholars
University of Tartu alumni
Academic staff of the University of Tartu
Recipients of the Order of the White Star, 4th Class